The 1996–97 Liverpool F.C. season was the 105th season in the club's existence, and their 35th consecutive year in the top-flight of English football. In addition to the FA Premier League (known as the FA Carling Premiership for sponsorship reasons), the club competed in the FA Cup, League Cup, and the Cup Winners' Cup.

Season overview
Liverpool led the Premiership for much of the season, and established a five-point lead at the top before New Year's Day 1997. However, the team were overtaken by Manchester United in the latter stages of the season, and it was United who ultimately won the league, though Liverpool squandered several more chances to reclaim the top position. The side were marred both by the rise of the "Spice Boys" culture, as well as by defensive aberrations; dropping points at their previously impregnable Anfield home. A 2–1 home defeat against bottom of the table Coventry City denied Liverpool the chance to return to top spot with six games to go, United having lost at home to Derby the previous day. Indeed, a win over United at Anfield in April would have put Liverpool top with just three matches to go, but United won 3–1 to effectively clinch the title. The title lost, Liverpool still went into the final match of the season in second place with a two-point lead over Newcastle and Arsenal, but a 1–1 draw with Sheffield Wednesday meant they ended up finishing 4th on goal difference, thus missing out on a place in the newly expanded UEFA Champions League and leaving Roy Evans and his team with a UEFA Cup place as scant consolation for a season which had promised much and giving rise to the phrase "finishing fourth in a two horse race".

In the cups there was more disappointment. Liverpool's UEFA Cup Winners' Cup campaign ended in the semi-finals with a 3–2 aggregate defeat to Paris St Germain. In the FA Cup they lost 4–2 to eventual winners Chelsea in the fourth round, having led 2–0 at half-time and squandered chances to extend their lead. Liverpool were knocked out in the Coca-Cola Cup quarter-finals by eventual finalists Middlesbrough.

The side were nevertheless praised for their attractive attacking style of football. Steve McManaman and Robbie Fowler continued to excel for the club, and Fowler continued his prolific strike partnership with Stan Collymore, scoring 47 goals between them. Fowler's suspension for the final four games was a big blow and effectively ended any lingering hopes of title glory. Fowler also received a UEFA Fair Play award, for protesting that he had not been fouled by Arsenal goalkeeper David Seaman when the referee awarded a penalty kick. The season also saw the debut of teenage prodigy Michael Owen.

Former defender Mark Wright stated in an interview that this was the season in the 1990s that the Liverpool team truly had the talent and opportunity to win the title but threw it away: "We did come close to winning the league a few times and we finished fourth one season when we were the best team. We were better than Manchester United, better than everyone, and we finished joint second but ended up fourth because of goal difference. That was the season we should have won the title and we all know that. I remember some of the games we lost and the way we dropped points against certain sides. David James dropped a few clangers and I remember them because in certain games he didn't have anything to do, then all of a sudden he thinks he's got to be involved in the game. He would come rushing out and all of a sudden you would be 1–0 down", he said.

First-team squad

Transfers

In

Out

Competitions

Premier League

League table

Results by round

Matches

FA Cup

Football League Cup

Cup Winners' Cup

Statistics

Appearances and goals

|-
! colspan=14 style=background:#dcdcdc; text-align:center| Goalkeepers

|-
! colspan=14 style=background:#dcdcdc; text-align:center| Defenders

|-
! colspan=14 style=background:#dcdcdc; text-align:center| Midfielders

|-
! colspan=14 style=background:#dcdcdc; text-align:center| Forwards

|-
! colspan=14 style=background:#dcdcdc; text-align:center| Players transferred out during the season

|}

Goal scorers

Competition top scorers

Notes

References

Liverpool F.C. seasons
Liverpool